The 56th Grey Cup was played November 30, 1968, and the Ottawa Rough Riders defeated the Calgary Stampeders 24–21 before 32,655 fans at Toronto's CNE Stadium. Vic Washington's 79-yard run is still a Grey Cup record, and he won the Grey Cup Most Valuable Player award. This was the final Grey Cup game to be played on a Saturday; beginning the next year and since then (except for 1970), all Grey Cup games have been played on a Sunday.

Box score 
First Quarter

Ottawa – Single – Don Sutherin 00 yard kick

Second Quarter

Ottawa – FG – Don Sutherin 27-yard field goal
Calgary – TD – Peter Liske 1-yard run (Larry Robinson convert)
Calgary – TD – Terry Evanshen 21-yard pass from Peter Liske (Larry Robinson convert)

Third Quarter

Ottawa – TD – Russ Jackson 1-yard run (Don Sutherin convert)

Fourth Quarter

Ottawa – TD – Vic Washington 79-yard run (convert blocked)
Ottawa – TD – Margene Adkins 70-yard pass from Russ Jackson (Don Sutherin convert)
Calgary – TD – Terry Evanshen 4-yard pass from Peter Liske (Larry Robinson convert)

1968 Miss Grey Cup

Miss Edmonton Eskimos Barbara Casault was named Miss Grey Cup 1968, with Miss Toronto Argonauts Jacquie Perrin the first runner-up, and Miss Hamilton Tiger-Cats Kathy Cumming the second runner-up.  A second-year education student at the University of Alberta, she received a new 1969 convertible, a trip for two to Mexico, a mink stole, a movie camera and a diamond watch set.  Each contestant received $1,500 in prizes.  Casault's prizes were worth $15,000, with those for the first-runner up worth $2,700 and the second runner-up worth $2,200.
Miss Saskatchewan Roughriders Donna Hardy was chosen the inaugural Miss Personality Plus by the other contestants.
Selection of Miss Grey Cup was done on the basis of personality and poise (30 points), carriage and figure (15 points), make-up and grooming (10 points), speech and projection (10 points), cheerleader costume (10 points) and overall impression (10 points).

References

External links
 

Grey Cup
Grey Cup
Grey Cups hosted in Toronto
Calgary Stampeders
Ottawa Rough Riders
1968 in Toronto
1968 in Canadian television
November 1968 sports events in Canada